La quiero a morir (Spanish: Love her to death) is a 2008 Colombian telenovela produced and broadcast by Caracol TV.

Plot 
The telenovela starts with the celebration of the 20th anniversary of Manuela Sáenz (Ana María Trujillo) and Germán Rico (Luigy Aicardi) marriage; they have two daughters, Andrea (Margarita Muñoz) and Juliana (Luz del Sol Neisa). As the party goes on, Germán and his secret lover, Catalina (Martha Restrepo) —who turns out to be Manuela's best friend—, decide to escape together. When Manuela realizes this, it is too late: Germán has abandoned and ruined her and their daughters, since he had some debts and made obscure movements with the finances of the company he was running.

Manuela decides to rebuild her life. She meets Sansón (Mijaíl Mulkay), who comes to take possession of one of the houses he bought from Germán, while still owing him. This is why Manuela ends up sharing the house with Sansón's family. Manuela and Sansón fall in love with each other, but he has a relationship with Yuri (Majida Issa), who makes anything she can to keep him by her side and pushing him away from Manuela.

References

Cast 
Mijail Mulkay as Rito Sansón Pulido
Ana María Trujillo as Manuela Sáenz
Margarita Muñoz as Andrea Rico
Majida Issa as Yuri Liliana Consuelo
Luigi Aycardi as Germán Rincón
Ana María Kamper as Elisa
Luz del Sol as Juliana Rico
Margarita Ortega as Viviana
Astrid Hernández as Policarpa Pola Saavedra
Ana Soler as Lucrecia Sáenz
Sebastián Caicedo as Camilo Mondragón
Ángela Vergara as Sonia Bermúdez
Fernando Arévalo as Claudio Días Granados
Robinson Amariz as Diego Mondragón
Tommy Vásquez as Stalin Pulido
Martha Restrepo as Catalina Rodríguez
Andrés Suárez as Sergio Iragorri
Astrid Junguito as Eulalia Pulido
Orlando Lamboglia as Jorge Cortázar
Yolanda Rayo as Piedad Saavedra
Juan Carlos Messier as Jorge
Fernando Lara as Rasquín
Freddy Flórez as Roosevelt Pulido
 as Felipe
Juliana Betancourth as Mónica
Katherine Escobar as Katherine "Cathy" Belalcázar
Víctor Hugo Ruiz as Gonzalo Mondragón
John Ceballos as Loko
Juan Pablo Barragán as Tito Fuentes
Catalina Aristizábal as Cecilia Solano
Liliana Escobar as Dania
Carlos Torres as Lamborghini Soto
María Cecilia Botero as Laura Ospina

External links
  Official website
  La quiero a morir on the Caracol TV Internacional catalogue
 

2008 telenovelas
2008 Colombian television series debuts
2009 Colombian television series endings
Colombian telenovelas
Caracol Televisión telenovelas
Spanish-language telenovelas
Television shows set in Bogotá